Gurre is a village located five kilometres west of Helsingør and 42 kilometres north of central Copenhagen, Denmark. It is located on the east side of Gurre Lake and is almost surrounded by woodland. As of 1 January 2021, its population was 396. It is most known for the ruin of Gurre Castle

History
A settlement developed outside the Gurre Castle, probably some time during the beginning of the 14th century since the locality is referred to as Gurffue ("Gurre houses") in 1336. In 1361, King Valdemar IV of Denmark asked for permission the establish St. Jacob's Chapel outside the castle. The current village emerged at a site just east of the castle after it was abandoned and fell into neglect in the years after the Reformation. In 1791, it consisted of six farm and four other houses. Gurre Schoo was built in 1821 and transferred to the civil parish of Tikøb  in 1842.

Landmarks
 
Gurre Church is from 1918 and was designed y Carl Brummer. Gurre parish was not disjoined from Tikøb parish until 2010.

Gurrehus traces its name back to the 16th century and was from 1713 home to the local forester. The estate was owned by the crown until 1779. Later owners include Prince George of Greece who expanded and adapted the house with the assistance of the architect Gotfred Tvede.

 
Located across the street from Gurrehus, Valdemarslund is from the 1800s and has also served as residence for the forester. It consists of three detached wings and a small half-timbered building in the garden. The main wing was extended in about 1850. The complex was listed in 1982.

The country estate Ørsholt is today owned by Peter Beier, a well-known Danish chocolatier, who runs his company from the premises.

Surroundings
The village of Gurre is almost completely surrounded by the small woods Nyrup Hegn, Teglstrup Hegn, Horserød Hegn, Gurre Vang and Krogenberg Hegn. Gurre Lake has a highly irregular shape, a total area of  2.4 km2 and a depth of 2-5,5 metres. Originally a very clear-watered oligotroph lake, it now suffers from severe eutrophication.

Bibliography
 Vivian Etting, Lone Hvass, Charlotte Boje Andersen: Gurre slot: kongeborg og sagnskat. 2003. 
 Ditlevsen, Stephen (editor): Gurre. Forsvarets Center for Lederskab, Gurrehus. 1992. Pages 7-20: Lars Bjørn Madsen: Lidt om landsbyen Gurre''.

References

External links

 girre.dk
 History and images

Helsingør Municipality
Villages in Denmark